Roberto Lerici (April 30, 1924 in Rivarolo Ligure – March 4, 2004 in Athens, Greece) was an Italian professional football player and coach.

External links

1924 births
2004 deaths
Italian footballers
Serie A players
Serie B players
Spezia Calcio players
Pisa S.C. players
Inter Milan players
L.R. Vicenza players
U.S. Alessandria Calcio 1912 players
Italian football managers
L.R. Vicenza managers
U.C. Sampdoria managers
S.S.C. Napoli managers
Genoa C.F.C. managers
Venezia F.C. managers
Como 1907 managers
A.S.D. HSL Derthona players
Association football midfielders
People from Rivarolo Ligure